Wild dogs may refer to:
African wild dog also called painted dogs
Dingo–dog hybrids in Australia
Free-ranging dog#Free-ranging unowned dogs, including feral dogs and "wild" dogs
Wild Dogs, an American heavy metal band from Portland, Oregon
Wild Dogs (film), a 1985 Cuban drama film
 A song from Teaser, the debut solo album by guitarist Tommy Bolin
 A song from Funeral, the thirteenth studio album by rapper Lil Wayne